Protein tyrosine phosphatase, mitochondrial 1 is a protein in humans that is primarily coded by the gene PTPMT1 gene.

References

Further reading

External links 
 PDBe-KB provides an overview of all the structure information available in the PDB for Mouse Phosphatidylglycerophosphatase and protein-tyrosine phosphatase 1 (PTPMT1)